Sphingomonas glacialis  is a Gram-positive, rod-shaped, psychrophilic and non-motile bacteria from the genus of Sphingomonas which has been isolated from cryoconite from the Stubai Glacier in Tyrol in Austria.

References

Further reading

External links
Type strain of Sphingomonas glacialis at BacDive -  the Bacterial Diversity Metadatabase	

glacialis
Bacteria described in 2011
Psychrophiles